ETB 3 is the third television channel from the Euskal Irrati Telebista group in the Basque Autonomous Community, Navarre and the French Basque Country in Spain. The channel broadcasts entirely in Basque.

History
ETB3 was launched on October 10, 2008 as EiTB's third own channel, replacing Canal Vasco on Basque Country DTT. It was the second Spanish regional channel aimed at children after Super3 in Catalonia.

Programming
The channel was created with the aim of retaining a new audience to the EiTB channels, so its programming is aimed at children, so most of its programming is occupied by cartoons. The channel broadcasts in Basque language. Previously, the channel also broadcast some cultural and entertainment programs aimed at a teenage audience.

References

External links
Hiru3

EITB
Basque-language television stations
Television stations in Spain
Television channels and stations established in 2008
Spanish-language television stations